Song Bo (born 4 April 1985) is a Chinese cross-country skier. She competed in four events at the 2006 Winter Olympics.

References

External links
 

1985 births
Living people
Chinese female cross-country skiers
Olympic cross-country skiers of China
Cross-country skiers at the 2006 Winter Olympics
Place of birth missing (living people)
Sportspeople from Jilin City
Cross-country skiers at the 2007 Asian Winter Games
Cross-country skiers at the 2011 Asian Winter Games
Skiers from Jilin